At the British general election of 1931, 25 candidates closely connected to the Labour Party stood for election without the party's official endorsement, primarily as a result of disagreements over changes in the party's rules introduced shortly before the election. All but one of the candidates were members of the Independent Labour Party which was then affiliated to the Labour Party; the remaining candidate had been adopted by a Constituency Labour Party whom the central party thought lacked the finance and organisation to fight the election. Six of these candidates were elected, one of whom through an unopposed nomination.

Background
During the second Labour Government from 1929, the Independent Labour Party had become increasingly alienated from the party as a whole. Although 142 out of the 287 Labour MPs were members of the ILP, most took membership automatically and only a small number were aligned with the leadership. At the 1930 conference of the ILP, a resolution was passed that henceforth ILP MPs should back its policy instead of Labour Party policy where the two were in conflict; 18 MPs accepted this resolution, and formed a quasi-independent group in Parliament under the leadership of James Maxton (MP for Glasgow Bridgeton). The Labour Party objected to this situation and refused to give endorsement to ILP sponsored candidates in by-elections unless they signed a pledge which effectively reversed the conference decision.

In 1931 the Parliamentary Labour Party adopted a new set of Standing Orders which tightened up on discipline, and required that Labour MPs support the party programme. The new standing orders were endorsed at the Labour Party conference in October 1931 by 2,117,000 to 193,000, and on 7 October 1931 (the day after the general election was called), the National Executive Committee ruled that all candidates would have to sign an undertaking to abide by the new standing orders in order to receive official endorsement. Maxton considered that the conference decision effectively expelled him from the party and refused to sign.

Candidates
The last-minute nature of preparations for the general election led to a scramble to adopt candidates. Eventually 25 candidates were nominated. The Labour Party's reaction to them varied. Six were elected.

Aftermath
In the new Parliament, James Maxton, together with John McGovern and Richard Wallhead, formed a separate Independent Labour Party Parliamentary group. David Kirkwood and George Buchanan subsequently joined the group. Later in the Parliament, Kirkwood and Wallhead rejoined the Parliamentary Labour Party. Wedgwood did not join the ILP group and took the Labour whip once Parliament met.

References

1931 in the United Kingdom
Labour Party (UK) politicians
History of the Labour Party (UK)
1931 in British politics
Independent Labour Party parliamentary candidates